Morelos is a municipality in the Mexican state of Michoacán, located approximately  northwest of the state capital of Morelia.

Geography
It borders the Michoacanese municipalities of Puruándiro to the northwest, Huandacareo to the east, Chucándiro to the southeast, Huaniqueo to the southwest, and Jiménez to the northwest. It also borders the municipality of Yuriria in Guanajuato to the northeast.

As of 2009, the land cover in Morelos consists of temperate forest (30%), grassland (13%), and tropical forest (5%). Another 49% of the land is used for agriculture and 2% consists of urban areas. Morelos is located in the Lerma River basin. There are small reservoirs named Epitacio Huerta and Caballerias in the municipality, which are used for agricultural irrigation.

Morelos has a temperate climate with rain in the summer.

History
The place now known as Morelos was originally called Huango, and was part of the Tarascan state in pre-Hispanic Mexico. Huango was one of the 61 municipalities created in Michoacán in 1831. In 1898, the municipal seat was renamed Huango de Morelos. In 1902 the seat was renamed Villa Morelos and the municipality itself renamed Morelos.

Administration
The municipal government comprises a president, a councillor (Spanish: síndico), and seven trustees (regidores), four elected by relative majority and three by proportional representation. The current president of the municipality is José Guadalupe Coria Solís.

Demographics
In the 2010 Mexican Census, the municipality of Morelos recorded a population of 8091 inhabitants living in 2123 households. The 2015 Intercensal Survey estimated a population of 7806 inhabitants in Morelos.

There are 31 localities in the municipality, of which only the municipal seat Villa Morelos is classified as urban. It recorded a population of 2446 inhabitants in the 2010 Census.

Economy
The main economic activity in Morelos is agriculture. Corn is the main crop, followed by forage oats.

References

Municipalities of Michoacán
1831 establishments in Mexico
States and territories established in 1831